Marandiz (also Romanized as Mārandīz; also known as Mār Āndīz) is a village in Sahra Rural District, Anabad District, Bardaskan County, Razavi Khorasan Province, Iran. At the 2006 census, its population was 651, in 162 families.

References 

Populated places in Bardaskan County